Iker Casas García (born 23 September 1999) is a Mexican taekwondo practitioner. He won a bronze medal at the 2018 Central American and Caribbean Games and a silver at the 2021 Pan American Championships.

Career
Casas suffered a quick exit after two matches at the 2014 World Junior Championships in Taiwan. Casas was subsequently promoted to the senior national team in 2017, though he was unable to compete for a spot at that year's World Championships due to injury.

In 2018, Casas qualified for the World Taekwondo Grand Slam by winning a silver medal at the first Open Qualification Tournament in April. That summer, he won a bronze medal at the Central American and Caribbean Games, losing in the semifinals to eventual gold medalist Bernardo Pié. He took the place of teammate Saúl Gutiérrez, who was unavailable for the tournament after undergoing knee surgery.

At the 2019 World Championships, Casas defeated Michele Ceccaroni of San Marino in the round of 64 before falling to Lee Dae-hoon. He qualified by defeating  at the national selection tournament in Mexico City earlier that year. Nava returned the favor by denying Casas a place at the 2019 Pan American Games.

After the onset of the COVID-19 pandemic, Casas won a silver medal at the 2021 Pan American Championships held in Cancún.

Personal life
Casas hails from the State of Mexico.

References

External links
 Iker Casas at TaekwondoData.com

Living people
1999 births
Mexican male taekwondo practitioners
Competitors at the 2018 Central American and Caribbean Games
Central American and Caribbean Games bronze medalists for Mexico
Central American and Caribbean Games medalists in taekwondo
Sportspeople from the State of Mexico
21st-century Mexican people